Halfdansson is a Nordic surname that may refer to:

 Eystein Halfdansson (c. 668 – 730)
 Hemming Halfdansson (died 837)
 Harald "Klak" Halfdansson (c. 785 – c. 852)
 Haraldr Hálfdansson (c. 850 – c. 932)
 Sigurd Syr Halfdansson (died 1018)